Guy Sauvin is a French karateka. He won multiple medals in Karate World Championships and European Karate Championships in kumite.

References 

1942 births
Living people
French male karateka
20th-century French people
21st-century French people